Charles Stuart Rangeley-Wilson  is an author of three works of non-fiction: Somewhere Else (2004) The Accidental Angler (2006) and Silt Road (2013). He is known for his writing in the periodicals The Field in the UK (in 2001 he won the Periodical Publishers Association Specialist Writer of the Year Award for his work in that magazine) and Gray's Sporting Journal in the USA, as well as in newspapers such as The Times and The Daily Telegraph. A broadcaster and film-maker he has written and presented for the BBC, including the critically acclaimed BBC4 film Fish! A Japanese Obsession   and the BBC2 series The Accidental Angler. In 2006 The Angling Writers Association voted The Accidental Angler their Travel book of the Year and in 2011 the same organisation voted Rangeley-Wilson Travel Writer of the year and Arthur Oglesby Writer of the Year.

Rangeley-Wilson studied at the Ruskin School of Drawing and Fine Art in Oxford and taught Art for a decade before turning to writing. He is a passionate conservationist with a particular interest in English chalk-streams. In 1997 he was a founder of The Wild Trout Trust - a UK charity founded to promote grass-roots river conservation – and he is currently serving as President of that organisation. In recent years he has worked with WWF UK to promote more sustainable water management in chalk rivers. In 2011 he helped found The Norfolk Rivers Trust to promote river conservation in his home county and he is currently their Technical and Projects Advisor. He also serves as Ambassador for The Angling Trust.

Rangeley-Wilson's most recent work, the non-fiction novel Silt Road - The Story of a Lost River (Chatto and Windus 2013) is an elegy to the English landscape, an exploration of the layers of history that make a place, told through the history of a small chalk river and the biographies of a handful of men whose lives the river shaped.

Rangeley-Wilson was appointed Officer of the Order of the British Empire (OBE) in the 2022 Birthday Honours for services to chalk stream conservation.

Works

 Somewhere Else, Yellow Jersey Press, 2004.
 The Accidental Angler, Yellow Jersey Press, 2006.
 The Accidental Angler, 4 x 60 mins, BBC2 2006. The series combines travel and culture with fishing adventures in India, Bhutan, Brazil and London.
 Chalk-Stream, The Medlar Press, 2006. An anthology of prose and poetry in praise of the English chalk-stream, edited by Rangeley-Wilson.
 Fish! A Japanese Obsession, 1 x 90 mins, Keo Films 2009. The author's attempt to understand the notoriously impenetrable Japanese culture and mindset through a shared passion for fish and fishing.
 Silt Road - The Story of a Lost River, Chatto and Windus, 2013.
Silver shoals _The Five Fish that made Britain , 2018
 ‘’Lifelines-An Anthology of Angling Anecdotes, and More…‘’ NAROD Publishing, 2021. A collection of 27 short stories centred around angling by 27 different authors including “The best waste of time ever invented” by Charles Rangeley-Wilson.

References

External links
 Rangeley-Wilson's homepage

British writers
Living people
Year of birth missing (living people)
Officers of the Order of the British Empire